KELT-21b is an extrasolar planet discovered in 2017.

KELT-21b orbits KELT-21 A (HD 332124). It orbits the primary star in a triple star system, with the other two stars located 1.2 arcseconds away. The primary star is heavy at  1.458, extremely hot at 8210 K and rapidly rotating (equatorial velocity equal to 141 km/s). The planetary orbit is well aligned with the equatorial plane of the host star, with misalignment equal to −5.6°

Transmission planetary spectroscopy was performed in 2021, based on a single transit observation in 2019. High planetary gravity and relatively low planetary temperature made detection of an atmosphere impossible that time.

References

Transiting exoplanets
Giant planets
Exoplanets discovered in 2018
Virgo (constellation)
Hot Jupiters